Lee Shun Yang (born 27 June 2001) is a Malaysian badminton player. He won a silver medal in badminton at the 2021 Southeast Asian Games in the men's team event.

Career 
Lee competed in the 2019 BWF World Junior Championships. In the men's singles event, he lost in the first round to Joakim Oldorff of Finland. In 2021, he won his first senior title at the Hellas International. 

In 2022, Lee finished up as a semifinalist at the Ukraine Open. A few months later, Lee helped the Malaysian men's team to clinch silver at the 2021 Southeast Asian Games.

Achievements

BWF International Challenge/Series (1 title) 
Men's singles

  BWF International Challenge tournament
  BWF International Series tournament
  BWF Future Series tournament

References

External links 

 

2001 births
Living people
People from Penang
Malaysian sportspeople of Chinese descent
Malaysian male badminton players
Competitors at the 2021 Southeast Asian Games
Southeast Asian Games silver medalists for Malaysia
Southeast Asian Games medalists in badminton